Inderjit S. Dhillon is the Gottesman Family Centennial Professor of Computer Science and Mathematics at the University of Texas at Austin, where he is also the Director of the ICES Center for Big Data Analytics. His main research interests are in machine learning, data analysis, parallel computing, network analysis, linear algebra and optimization.

Biography 
Dhillon received his B.Tech. degree from the Indian Institute of Technology, Bombay in 1989. He subsequently worked at AT&T Bell Laboratories as a Research Staff Member under Dr. Narendra Karmarkar. He received his Ph.D. from the University of California at Berkeley in 1997 under the direction of Beresford Parlett and James Demmel. Dhillon joined the Computer Science faculty at the University of Texas at Austin in 1999.

Academic works 
Dhillon's main research interests are in machine learning, data analysis and computational mathematics. His emphasis is on developing novel algorithms that respect the underlying problem structure and are scalable to large data sets. In computational mathematics, he is best known for his work on developing the first numerically stable O(n^2) algorithm for the symmetric tridiagonal eigenvalue problem. His software is now part of LAPACK, and is the method of choice in various software packages, such as the function "eigen" in R. In machine learning, Dhillon is well known for his work on clustering and co-clustering high dimensional data sets, metric and kernel learning, inverse covariance estimation, divide-and-conquer methods, and NOMADic methods for large-scale problems in machine learning.

Honors and awards
Dhillon is a fellow of the Association for Computing Machinery (ACM), a fellow of the Institute of Electrical and Electronics Engineers (IEEE), a fellow of the Society for Industrial and Applied Mathematics (SIAM), and a fellow of the American Association for the Advancement of Science (AAAS). In addition, he has received the ICES Distinguished Research Award, the SIAM Outstanding Paper Prize, the Moncrief Grand Challenge Award, the SIAM Linear Algebra Prize, the University Research Excellence Award, and the NSF Career Award.

References

External links 
 Home page at UT Austin

Living people
Computer scientists
IIT Bombay alumni
University of California, Berkeley alumni
University of Texas at Austin faculty
Fellows of the Association for Computing Machinery
Fellows of the American Mathematical Society
Fellow Members of the IEEE
Fellows of the American Association for the Advancement of Science
Year of birth missing (living people)